One Dozen Berrys is the second studio album of Chuck Berry, released in March 1958 on Chess Records, catalogue LP 1432. With the exception of five new songs, "Rockin' at the Philharmonic," "Guitar Boogie," "In-Go," "How You've Changed," and "It Don't Take but a Few Minutes," and one alternate take, "Low Feeling", all tracks had been previously released on 45 rpm singles. It was also released in the United Kingdom. In 2012, Hoodoo reissued the album with Chuck Berry Is on Top on the same CD. Sheldon Recording Studio, where all of the recordings were made, was located at 2120 South Michigan Ave. in Chicago and eventually became Chess Studios.

Track listing
All tracks written by Chuck Berry.

Side one
 "Sweet Little Sixteen" – 3:03
 "Blue Feeling" - Instrumental – 3:04
 "La Juanda (Espanola)" – 3:14
 "Rockin' at the Philharmonic" - Instrumental – 3:23
 "Oh Baby Doll" – 2:37
 "Guitar Boogie" - Instrumental – 2:21

Side two
 "Reelin' and Rockin'"  – 3:18
 "In-Go" - Instrumental  – 2:29
 "Rock and Roll Music" – 2:34
 "How You've Changed" – 2:49
 "Low Feeling" – 3:09 same recording as "Blue Feeling", but with the tape playback slowed
 "It Don't Take but a Few Minutes" – 2:31

Personnel
 Chuck Berry – vocals, guitars
 Hubert Sumlin – electric guitar
 Johnnie Johnson, Lafayette Leake –  piano
 Willie Dixon – bass
 Fred Below, Ebbie Hardy – drums

References

External links 

Chuck Berry albums
1958 albums
Albums produced by Phil Chess
Albums produced by Leonard Chess
Chess Records albums